“Ride 'Em Cowboy” is a song written by American singer-songwriter Paul Davis. First recorded on Davis' 1974 album of the same name, the single release peaked at No. 4 on the Billboard Adult Contemporary chart, No. 23 on the Billboard Hot 100, and No. 47 on the Country chart. It also charted in Canada and Australia.

Chart performance

Covers
Artists who have recorded cover versions of the song include:

Pluto Shervington (on his 1975 album Pluto)
Buddy Alan (on his 1978 Sun Devil Records single)
Juice Newton (on her 1981 album Juice) - U.S. Billboard Country #32, in 1984
David Allan Coe (on the 1983 Kat Family Records album “All American Cowboys”)
The Remingtons (on their 1993 album Aim for the Heart)

References

1974 singles
1974 songs
1984 singles
Bang Records singles
Capitol Records singles
David Allan Coe songs
Juice Newton songs
Paul Davis (singer) songs
Song recordings produced by Richard Landis
Songs written by Paul Davis (singer)
The Remingtons songs